The top tier of Slovenian football, the Slovenian PrvaLiga, was formed in 1991 after Slovenia became an independent country, and was firstly contested in the 1991–92 season. The following page details the football records and statistics of the Slovenian PrvaLiga since then. All statistics below are correct as of end of the 2021–22 Slovenian PrvaLiga season.

League records

Titles
Most titles: 16, Maribor
Most consecutive title wins: 7, Maribor (between 1996–97 and 2002–03)
Biggest title-winning margin: 20 points, 2011–12; Maribor (85 points) over Olimpija Ljubljana (65 points)
Smallest title-winning margin: 0 points, joint record: 
2017–18 (Olimpija Ljubljana and Maribor both finished with 80 points; Olimpija won the title due to better head-to-head record)
2020–21 (Mura and Maribor both finished with 63 points; Mura won the title due to better head-to-head record)

Points
Most points in a season: 85, Maribor (2011–12)
Most points in a season without winning the league: 80, Maribor (2017–18)
Fewest points in a season: 3, Jadran Dekani (1994–95)
Fewest points in a season while winning the league: 44, Olimpija (1994–95)
Most points in total: 2,017, Maribor

Wins
Most wins in a season (40 games): 30, Olimpija (1991–92)
Fewest wins in a season: 0, joint record:
Jadran Dekani (1994–95)
Rudar Velenje (2019–20)
Most home wins in a season: 19, Olimpija (1991–92)
Most away wins in a season: 14, Maribor (2013–14 and 2018–19)
Most consecutive wins: 12, joint record:
Olimpija (between 8 March 1992 and 6 May 1992)
Maribor (between 22 May 1999 and 3 October 1999)
Most consecutive games without a win: 31, Jadran Dekani (between 12 June 1994 and 31 May 1995)
Most wins in total: 609, Maribor

Defeats
Most defeats in a season: 30, Izola (1995–96)
Fewest losses in a season: 2, joint record:
Olimpija (1993–94)
Maribor (1999–2000)
Olimpija Ljubljana (2017–18)
Longest unbeaten run: 32 games, Domžale (between 13 May 2006 and 15 April 2007)
Fewest home losses in a season: 0, joint record:
Maribor (1991–92, 1992–93, 1998–99, and 1999–2000)
Olimpija (1991–92, 1992–93, and 1993–94)
Gorica (1995–96 and 2005–06)
Izola (1991–92)
Beltinci (1994–95)
Mura (1995–96)
Primorje (1996–97)
Koper (2001–02)
Domžale (2006–07)
Olimpija Ljubljana (2017–18)
Fewest away losses in a season: 0, Maribor (2002–03)
Most consecutive losses: 15, Izola (between 17 March 1996 and 8 June 1996)
Most losses in total: 390, Celje

Draws
Most draws in a season: 18, Naklo (1991–92)
Fewest draws in a season: 3, Jadran Dekani (1994–95)
Most home draws in a season: 10, Naklo (1991–92)
Most consecutive draws: 8, Koper (between 12 August 2006 and 23 September 2006)
Most draws in total: 281, Celje

Attendances

Highest attendance, single game: 14,000, joint record:
Maribor v. Beltinci, 1 June 1997
Olimpija Ljubljana v. Maribor, 7 May 2016
Highest average home attendance: 5,289, Maribor (1996–97)
Total all-time attendance: 6,795,089
Average match attendance: 1,107

All-time attendances

Goals
Most goals scored in a season: 102, Olimpija (1991–92)
Fewest goals scored in a season: 12, Jadran Dekani (1994–95)
Most goals conceded in a season: 140, Izola (1995–96)
Fewest goals conceded in a season: 17, Olimpija Ljubljana (2017–18)
Best goal difference in a season: +84, Olimpija (1991–92)
Worst goal difference in a season: –127, Izola (1995–96)
Most goals scored in total: 2,022, Maribor
Most goals conceded in total: 1,422, Celje

Player records

Appearances
Most PrvaLiga appearances: 488, Sebastjan Gobec (Celje, 2 March 1997 to 30 May 2015)
Most PrvaLiga minutes played: 40,521, Sebastjan Gobec
Most seasons appeared in: 19, Sebastjan Gobec (every season from 1996–97 to 2014–15)
Oldest player: Jasmin Handanović,  (for Maribor v. Celje, 12 July 2020)

Updated as of 1 June 2022.

Goals
First PrvaLiga goal: Miljenko Dovečer (for Nafta v. Beltinci, 18 August 1991)
Most PrvaLiga goals: 159, Marcos Tavares
Most goals in a season: 29, Zoran Ubavič (1991–92)
Fastest goal: 8 seconds, Marcos Tavares (for Maribor v. Domžale, 22 April 2017)
Youngest goalscorer: Martin Kramarič, 16 years, 4 months and 29 days (for Krka v. Rudar, 12 April 2014)
Most consecutive PrvaLiga appearances scored in: 10, Novica Nikčević (1997–98 and 1998–99)
Highest number of different clubs to score for: 8, Ermin Rakovič (Celje, Olimpija, Maribor, Mura, Domžale, Interblock, Drava Ptuj, Olimpija Ljubljana)
Most goals in a game: 5, joint record:
 Štefan Škaper (for Beltinci v. Kočevje, 31 May 1995)
 Zoran Ubavič (for Olimpija v. Jadran Dekani, 7 June 1992)
Most PrvaLiga hat-tricks: 8, Štefan Škaper
Most PrvaLiga own goals: 5, Alen Jogan
Most own goals in a season: 4, Žan Žužek (2020–21)

Updated as of 1 June 2022.

Disciplinary
Most red cards for a player: 11, Gregor Blatnik
Most yellow cards for a player: 146, Sebastjan Gobec

Match records

Scorelines
Biggest home win: 12–0, Olimpija v. Jadran Dekani (7 June 1992)
Biggest away win: 0–10, Jadran Dekani v. Slavija Vevče (22 October 1994)

All-time PrvaLiga table
The all-time Slovenian PrvaLiga table is a cumulative record of all official match results, points and goals of every team that has played in the PrvaLiga since its inception in 1991. The competition structure has changed over time and the number of clubs in the league varied, ranging from 21 in the first season to 10 in its present form. In addition, the 1995–96 season was the first one with the rule of three points being awarded for each win. Prior to that, each winning team received two points. The table that follows is accurate as of the end of the 2021–22 season.

Managers
Most PrvaLiga winner's medals: 6, joint record:
Bojan Prašnikar (Olimpija and Maribor) – 1993, 1994, 1997, 1998, 1999, 2002
Darko Milanič (Maribor) – 2009, 2011, 2012, 2013, 2017, 2019

Notes

References

Slovenian PrvaLiga
All-time football league tables
Association football league records and statistics